Robert Margalis (born February 8, 1982) is an American medley swimmer who won the gold medal in the men's 400-meter individual medley event at the 2003 Pan American Games.  At the next edition, four years later in Rio de Janeiro, he captured three silver medals. Robert also swam on Saint Petersburg Aquatics club team, with his sister Melanie Margalis.

References

External links
 
 
 

1982 births
Living people
American male medley swimmers
Georgia Bulldogs men's swimmers
Medalists at the FINA World Swimming Championships (25 m)
People from Queens, New York
Pan American Games gold medalists for the United States
Pan American Games silver medalists for the United States
Pan American Games medalists in swimming
Swimmers at the 2003 Pan American Games
Swimmers at the 2007 Pan American Games
Swimmers at the 2011 Pan American Games
Medalists at the 2003 Pan American Games
Medalists at the 2007 Pan American Games
Medalists at the 2011 Pan American Games
21st-century American people